In Dutch and Belgian cuisine, rijsttaart(je)/rijstevlaai (Dutch) or tarte au riz (French) (all translate to “rice flan”) is a pie with a filling based on rice pudding. It is native to Verviers and popular around the wider region of Eastern Belgium, south-eastern Netherlands and the German region around Aachen. It is best served cold.

Typically they are made 'single-crust'—with no layer of pastry covering the top.

Belgian cuisine
Dutch pastries
Limburgian cuisine
Rhenish cuisine
Dutch words and phrases
Sweet pies
Rice dishes
Verviers